DnaJ homolog subfamily C member 14 is a protein that in humans is encoded by the DNAJC14 gene.

Interactions
DNAJC14 has been shown to interact with Dopamine receptor D1.

References

Further reading

Heat shock proteins